Norwell High School is a public secondary school accredited by the New England Association of Schools and Colleges (NEASC). It is located in Norwell, Massachusetts, United States. The school includes approximately 50 full-time teachers. Its students consistently score above state and national averages on the SAT and other standardized tests, and on average, 97% of students from each graduating class at Norwell High School continue on to post-secondary education.

NHS has been ranked as the 12th best secondary school in Massachusetts, and is ranked in the top 6% for best public education high schools in the country by Newsweek Magazine.

Administration
On July 1, 2011, William Fish became the new principal of Norwell High School, replacing Matthew Keegan, who had been serving the school since 2006. The school's administration includes assistant principals Matthew Marani and Jennifer Greenberg.  The school's administration also includes four guidance counselors 

Toward the end of the 1980s Norwell High School lowered their grading system, as the numbers were higher than standard grading systems.
(For example, a final grade of 82 was a C+ versus a B-)

The school's staff also includes nine cafeteria workers and six custodians.

Academics
The school's faculty offers a wide array of academic courses in several departments. Students that attended NHS are required to take four years of English, History, Mathematics and Science courses. Students are required to take at least three years of a Foreign Language. Some students complete their first year of foreign language while in middle school so they will only have to complete two years; some students choose to take their fourth and fifth year of a language and continue these courses into college. Students are required to take at least two years of Health/Physical Education(Gym Class). Students are also allowed to take other courses including classes in art, music and technology, as seen below.

In 2009 the school began Arabic classes after teachers asked for them to be established. As of 2015 25 students take Arabic I and 10 take Arabic II. As of 2015 few other high schools in Massachusetts offer Arabic.

Athletics
Norwell High School offers several sports programs for students that include:

In 2014, Norwell added two synthetic turf fields and a track and field facility to their athletic complex.

Co-curricular activities
The school includes clubs and activities, including:

 ADL : Anti-Defamation League Club
 AFS & International Club
 BioSTEM Club
 Book Club
 Clip Notes
 Club and Activity Clearance form
 Environmental Club
 Film Club
 Global Citizenship
 Halyard Literary & Arts Magazine
 Investment Club
 JSA ( Junior Statesmen of America)
 Latin Club
 LEAD
 Math Team
 Medical Careers Club
 Mock Trial
 National Honor Society
 Norwell Navigator Newspaper
 Norwell Volunteer Corps
 Peer Education
 Pep Band
 Robotics
 SADD
 Student Government
 Theater - 4th Wall Players
 Yearbook

Notable alumni

References

External links
Norwell High School web page

Schools in Plymouth County, Massachusetts
Public high schools in Massachusetts